The Thessaly Railway Museum (or Volos Railway Museum) was founded in 2006 and occupies the first floor in the beautiful building of Volos railway station in Thessaly, Greece.

The museum exhibits a collection of railway material from the past: rare photographs, uniforms, old telegraphs, machinery for issuing tickets of the 19th century made of wood and bronze, tools, watches, timetables, rolling stock components, traffic lights and old measurement instruments.  There is  also a documents collection, with rare books concerning railway architecture from the 19th century and other historic documents. The documents collection includes the blueprint drawings of Evaristo De Chirico for the construction of Pelion railway.

A current project involves the construction of an open air rolling stock exhibition at the southwestern area of the station, with the cooperation of University of Thessaly. It shall include 9-10 metre gauge steam locomotives and carriages of the late 19th century, including two coaches for the Royal family of Greece.

Currently the museum admits visitors by appointment, Mondays to Fridays 07:30-14:30.

See also
 Thessaly Railways

External links 
 Museum page on OSE site
 Greek Ministry of Culture, Volos Cultural Heritage

Volos
Rail transport in Thessaly
Museums established in 2006
2006 establishments in Greece
Museums in Volos